Golden Age of Russian Poetry (or Age of Pushkin) is the name traditionally applied by philologists to the first half of the 19th century. The most significant Russian poet Pushkin (in Nabokov's words, the greatest poet this world was blessed with since the time of Shakespeare) and other famous poets worked during this time. Mikhail Lermontov and Fyodor Tyutchev are generally regarded as two most important Romantic poets after Pushkin. Other poets include Pyotr Vyazemsky, Anton Delvig, Kondraty Ryleyev. The best-regarded of Pushkin's precursor Vasily Zhukovsky and Konstantin Batyushkov may be also included. Pushkin himself, however, considered Evgeny Baratynsky to be the finest poet of his day.

Poets

References

See also 
 Silver Age of Russian Poetry
 List of Russian-language poets

19th-century Russian literature
Russian Poetry
Poetry movements
Russian literary movements
Russian poetry